Trissexodon constrictus is a species of air-breathing land snail, a terrestrial pulmonate gastropod mollusk in the family Trissexodontidae.

Trissexodon constrictus is the type species of the genus Trissexodon.

Distribution 
This species endemic to the western Pyrenees and the Basque Country across 29 recorded localities, being recorded in Spain (throughout the Basque Mountains) and in France (in the Department of Hautes Pyrénées to Department of Pyrénées-Atlantiques), (under records of the IUCN).

Description 
The shell is finely and regularly ribbed. It is strongly depressed on the upper side. The lower side is rounded. The shell has 5-6 whorls. The aperture has a characteristic shape. The lip is reflected and forms a "U" shape when seen from above. The umbilicus is deep and covers 1/7 of the shell diameter.

The width of the shell is 6–8 mm; the height of the shell is 3–4 mm.

Ecology 
Trissexodon constrictus is found under stones in the soil of humid and shady deciduous forests, between moss, under leaf litter and occasionally near cave openings. It has been recorded from sea level to 800 m, and exceptionally to altitudes of 1500 m.

References
This article incorporates public domain text from the reference 

 Bank, R. A.; Neubert, E. (2017). Checklist of the land and freshwater Gastropoda of Europe. Last update: July 16th, 2017
 Gittenberger, E. (1968). Zur Systematik der in die Gattung Trissexodon Pilsbry (Helicidae, Helicodontinae) gerechneten Arten. Zoologische Mededelingen. 43 (13): 166-172. Leiden.
 Kerney, M.P., Cameron, R.A.D. & Jungbluth, J-H. (1983). Die Landschnecken Nord- und Mitteleuropas. Ein Bestimmungsbuch für Biologen und Naturfreunde, 384 pp., 24 plates

External links 
 Tryon G. W. (1895). Manual of Conchology (2)3: page 121. plate 24, figure 38-40.

Trissexodontidae
Gastropods described in 1836
Taxonomy articles created by Polbot